Miss USA 1964 was the 13th Miss USA pageant, held in Miami Beach, Florida on July 29, 1964.  This was the last Miss USA pageant to be held as an inclusive part of the Miss Universe event.

The pageant was won by Bobbi Johnson of the District of Columbia, who was crowned by outgoing titleholder Marite Ozers of Illinois.  Two days after her victory, Johnson went on to place as a top 15 semi-finalist at Miss Universe 1964.

Johnson was the first woman from Washington D.C. to win the title.

This was the latest Miss USA pageant ever held on this date until the 2020 competition.

Results

Historical significance 
 District of Columbia wins competition for the first time. Also becoming in the 11th state who does it for the first time.
 Texas earns the 1st runner-up position for the second time. The last time it placed this was in 1959.
 Alaska earns the 2nd runner-up position for the first time and it reaches it highest placement ever at the contest.
 Utah earns the 3rd runner-up position for the first time.
 Kentucky earns the 4th runner-up position for the first time.
 States that placed in semifinals the previous year were Alabama, California, District of Columbia, New York and Oklahoma.
 California and New York placed for the eighth consecutive year. 
 District of Columbia placed for the third consecutive year. 
 Alabama and Oklahoma made their second consecutive placement.
 Oregon, Texas and Utah last placed in 1962.
 Kentucky, Mississippi and New Jersey last placed in 1961.
 Maryland last placed in 1959.
 Ohio last placed in 1960.
 Alaska and Idaho placed for the first time.
 Arizona, Colorado, Illinois and Tennessee break an ongoing streak of placements since 1962.
 Nevada breaks an ongoing streak of placements since 1961.

Delegates
The Miss USA 1964 delegates were:

 Alabama – Pamela Borgfeldt
 Alaska – Patricia Marlin
 Arizona – Diane Reutter
 Arkansas – Barbara McGlothlin
 California – Jeanne Venables
 Connecticut – Patricia Powell
 Delaware – Christina Klosetju
 District of Columbia – Bobbi Johnson
 Florida – Candace Davenport
 Georgia – Lynda Tatum
 Hawaii – Wanda Byrd
 Idaho – Dorothy Johnson
 Illinois – Karen Weisbrook
 Indiana – Charlene Kratochvil
 Iowa – Barbara Rogers
 Kansas – Barbara Ford
 Kentucky – Johnna Reid
 Louisiana – Linda Graves
 Maine – Corneille Edwards
 Maryland – Royette Tarry
 Massachusetts – Barbara Robery
 Michigan – Johneane Teeter
 Mississippi – Patricia Turk
 Missouri – Sandy Bawol
 Nebraska – Georgia Merriam
 Nevada – Pamela Morris
 New Hampshire – Beverly Hebert
 New Jersey – Barbara Richartz
 New York – Dorothy Langhans
 Ohio – Gail Krielow
 Oklahoma – Jackie Maloney
 Oregon – Toye Esch
 Pennsylvania – Maryann Reilly
 Rhode Island – Carol Tantimonico
 South Carolina – Judy Kennedy
 Tennessee – Pat Kerr
 Texas – Diane Balloun
 Utah – Janet Erickson
 Vermont – Freda Betts
 Virginia – Heidi Smith
 Wisconsin – Carolyn Linquist

No state delegate: Colorado, Minnesota, Montana, New Mexico, North Carolina, North Dakota, South Dakota, Washington, West Virginia, Wyoming

References

External links 
 

1964
1964 in the United States
1964 beauty pageants